Under the Ottoman Empire's millet system, Christians and Jews were considered dhimmi (meaning "protected") under Ottoman law in exchange for loyalty to the state and payment of the jizya tax.

Orthodox Christians were the largest non-Muslim group. With the rise of Imperial Russia, the Russians became a kind of protector of the Orthodox Christians in the Ottoman Empire.

Conversion to Islam in the Ottoman Empire involved a combination of individual, family, communal and institutional initiatives and motives. The process was also influenced by the balance of power between the Ottomans and the neighboring Christian states. However, most Ottoman subjects in Eastern Europe remained Orthodox Christian, such as Serbs, Wallachia, Romania, Bulgarians, while present-day Albania, Bosnia and Kosovo had larger Muslim populations as a result of Ottoman influence.

Civil status

Ottoman religious tolerance was notable for being better than that which existed elsewhere in other great past or contemporary empires, such as Spain or England . But the Byzantine Empire, apart from during the time of Theodosius, generally did not condemn other religious groups either, there being a mosque built in Constantinople, a Latin Quarter filled with Roman Catholic Churches and even a synagogue. Of course, there were isolated instances of gaps between established policy and its actual practical application, but still, it was the mode of operation of the Empire.
Lewis and Cohen point out that until relatively modern times, tolerance in the treatment of non-believers, at least as it is understood in the West after John Locke, was neither valued, nor its absence condemned by both Muslims and Christians.

Under Ottoman rule, dhimmis (non-Muslim subjects) were allowed to "practice their religion, subject to certain conditions, and to enjoy a measure of communal autonomy" (see: Millet) and guaranteed their personal safety and security of property. In exchange for the guarantee of said security, citizens who fell under the category dhimmis paid a jizya, which was a tax exclusive to dhimmis.  In addition, Dhimmis had certain rules to follow that other Muslim citizens did not. For example, Dhimmis were forbidden from even attempting to convert Muslim citizens to their religious practice. While recognizing the inferior status of dhimmis under Islamic rule, Bernard Lewis, Professor Emeritus of Near Eastern Studies at Princeton University, states that, in most respects, their position was "very much easier than that of non-Christians or even of heretical Christians in medieval (Catholic) Europe." For example, dhimmis rarely faced martyrdom or exile, or forced compulsion to change their religion, and with certain exceptions, they were free in their choice of residence and profession. However, it is understood that Ottoman Empire was an Islamic state where the non-Muslims were inferior. There were strict divisions between religions which prevented integration.

Negative attitudes towards dhimmis harbored by the Ottoman governors were partly due to the "normal" feelings of a dominant group towards subject groups, to the contempt Muslims had for those whom they perceived to have willfully chosen to refuse to accept the truth and convert to Islam, and to certain specific prejudices and humiliations. The negative attitudes, however, rarely had any ethnic or racial components.

In the early years, the Ottoman Empire decreed that people of different millets should wear specific colors of, for instance, turbans and shoes — a policy that was not, however, always followed by Ottoman citizens.

Religion as an Ottoman institution

The Ottoman Empire constantly formulated policies balancing its religious problems. The Ottomans recognized the concept of clergy and its associated extension of religion as an institution. They brought established policies (regulations) over religious institutions through the idea of "legally valid" organizations.

The state's relationship with the Greek Orthodox Church was mixed, since the Orthodox were not killed, they were, in the beginning, the vast majority and taxpayers, they were encouraged through bribes and exemptions to convert to Islam. In turn, they could not proselytize Muslims. The church's structure was kept intact and largely left alone (but under close control and scrutiny) until the Greek War of Independence of 1821–1831 and, later in the 19th and early 20th centuries, during the rise of the Ottoman constitutional monarchy, which was driven to some extent by nationalistic currents. But the Church was greatly affected by the corruption brought in by the Ottoman system of choosing the Patriarch of Constantinople, and putting up the position of Patriarch for bribes. Other churches, like the Serbian Patriarchate of Peć (1766) and Archbishopric of Ohrid (1767), were dissolved and their dioceses placed under the jurisdiction of the Ecumenical Patriarchate of Constantinople. Churches had to be placed in inconspicuous areas, where the everyday populace would not see them.

Eventually, Capitulations of the Ottoman Empire (contracts with European powers) were negotiated, protecting the religious rights of Christians within the Empire. The Russians became formal protectors of the Eastern Orthodox groups in 1774, the French of the Catholics, and the British of the Jews and other groups.

Conversion

Historians Apostolos Vakalopoulos and Dimitar Angelov give assessment on the first Ottoman invasions of europe and their imposition of Islam to the Natove Balkan Christians:

Conversion to Islam in the Ottoman Empire involved a combination of individual, family, communal and institutional initiatives and motives. The process was also influenced by the balance of power between the Ottomans and the neighboring Christian states.

There is insufficient documentation of the process of conversion to Islam in Anatolia before the mid-15th century. By that time it was about 85% complete according to an Ottoman census, although it lagged in some regions such as Trabzon. In the Balkans, the general trend of conversion started slowly in the 14th century, reached its peak in the 17th century, and gradually petered out by the end of the 18th century, with significant regional variations.

The earliest converts to Islam came from the ranks of the Balkan nobility and military elites, who helped the Ottomans administer their native provinces. Although conversion was not required to obtain these posts, over time these local ruling elites tended to adopt Islam. Some scholars view proselyting Sufi mystics and the Ottoman state itself as important agents of conversion among broader populations. Other scholars argue that intermarriage and professional patronage networks were the most important factors of the religious transformation of the broader society. According to Halil İnalcık, the wish to avoid paying the jizya was an important incentive for conversion to Islam in the Balkans, while Anton Minkov has argued that it was only one among several motivating factors.

From the late 14th to the mid-17th century, the Ottomans pursued a policy of imposing a levy of male children (devşirme) on their Christian subjects in the Balkans with the goal of supplying the Ottoman state with capable soldiers and administrators. The compulsory conversion to Islam which these boys underwent as part of their education is the only documented form of systematic forced conversion organized by the Ottoman state.

According to historian Demetrios Constantelos, “Mass forced conversions were recorded during the caliphates of Selim I (1512–1520),…Selim II (1566–1574), and Murat III (1574–1595). On the occasion of some anniversary, such as the capture of a city, or a national holiday, many rayahs [Cattle/Christian Dhimmis] were forced to apostacize. On the day of the circumcision of Mohammed III great numbers of Christians (Albanians, Greeks, Slavs) were forced to convert to Islam.”

For strategic reasons, the Ottomans forcibly converted Christians living in the frontier regions of Macedonia and northern Bulgaria, particularly in the 16th and 17th centuries. Those who refused were either executed or burned alive.

According to Islamic law, the religion of the children was automatically changed after their parents converted. Many families collectively converted and their petitions as per Islamic customs for monetary help to the Ottoman Imperial Council are known. As marriages between non-Muslim men and Muslim women were forbidden under Sharia law, the refusal of husband to convert to Islam resulted in a divorce and the wife gaining custody of the children. Seventeenth-century sources indicate that non-Muslim women throughout the empire used this method to obtain a divorce.

The Ottomans tolerated Protestant missionaries within their realm, so long as they limited their proselytizing to the Orthodox Christians. With the increasing influence of Western powers and Russia in the 18th century, the process of conversion slowed down, and the Ottomans were pressured to turn a blind eye to re-conversion of many of their subjects to Christianity, although apostasy was prohibited under penalty of death according to Islamic law and the Ottomans had punished it strictly in earlier centuries.

Religion and the legal system
The main idea behind the Ottoman legal system was the "confessional community". The Ottomans tried to leave the choice of religion to the individual rather than imposing forced classifications. However, there were grey areas.

Ottoman practice assumed that law would be applied based on the religious beliefs of its citizens. However, the Ottoman Empire was organized around a system of local jurisprudence. Legal administration fit into a larger schema balancing central and local authority.  The jurisdictional complexity of the Ottoman Empire aimed to facilitate the integration of culturally and religiously different groups.

There were three court systems: one for Muslims, another for non-Muslims (dhimmis), involving appointed Jews and Christians ruling over their respective religious communities, and the "trade court". Dhimmis were allowed to operate their own courts following their own legal systems in cases that did not involve other religious groups, capital offences, or threats to public order. Christians were liable in a non-Christian court in specific, clearly defined instances, for example the assassination of a Muslim or to resolve a trade dispute.

The Ottoman judicial system institutionalized a number of biases against non-Muslims, such as barring non-Muslims from testifying as witnesses against Muslims. At the same time, non-Muslims "did relatively well in adjudicated interfaith disputes", because anticipation of judicial biases prompted them to settle most conflicts out of court.

In the Ottoman Empire of the 18th and 19th centuries, dhimmis frequently used the Muslim courts not only when their attendance was compulsory (for example in cases brought against them by Muslims), but also in order to record property and business transactions within their own communities. Cases were brought against Muslims, against other dhimmis and even against members of the dhimmi’s own family. Dhimmis often took cases relating to marriage, divorce and inheritance to Muslim courts so that they would be decided under shari'a law. Oaths sworn by dhimmis in the Muslim courts were sometimes the same as the oaths taken by Muslims, sometimes tailored to the dhimmis’ beliefs. Some Christian sources points that although Christians were not Muslims, there were instances which they were subjected to shari'a law. According to some western sources, "the testimony of a Christian was not considered as valid in the Muslim court as much as the testimony of a Muslim". In a Muslim court, a Christian witness had a problem of building trust; a Christian who took a "Muslim oath" over the Koran ("God is Allah and there is no other God"), committed perjury.

Persecution

Historian Warren Treadgold gives a summary on the historical background highlighting the cumulative effects of the relentless Turkish Muslim depredations against the Byzantine Empire in its Anatolian heartland by the late 14th century:

A Letter written by Manuel II Palaiologos in 1391 to Demetrios Kydones makes specific reference to the Turkish threat to the Byzantine Empire, noting how the Greek Christian inhabitants of Anatolia "have fled to the clefts in the rocks, to the forests, and to the mountain heights in an effort to escape a death from which there is no escape, a very cruel and inhuman death without any semblance of justice…. Nobody is spared, neither very young children nor defenseless women. For those whom old age or illness prevents from running away there is no hope of escaping the murderous blade."

Sultan Murad IV feared that the ottoman decline was a punishment from Allah for being lax on the enforcement of the Sharia. In 1631 He issued a decree re-enforcing the dress restrictions for dhimmis, to ensure they would “feel themselves subdued” (Qur’an 9:29):

The Ottoman Empire's treatment of its Christian subjects varied during its history. During the golden age of the empire, the millet system promised its Christian subjects better treatment than non-Christian populations experienced in Christian Europe, while during the decline and fall of the empire, the Christian minorities suffered a number of atrocities. Notable cases of persecution include the Constantinople massacre of 1821, the Chios massacre, the Destruction of Psara, the Batak massacre, the Hamidian massacres, the Adana massacre, the ethnic cleansing of Thracian Bulgarians in 1913, the Great Famine of Mount Lebanon and the Armenian genocide, Greek genocide and Assyrian genocide, all of which occurred during the Greek War of Independence or during the last few decades of the empire under the influence of Pan-Turkism. The share of non-Muslims in area within Turkey's current borders declined from 20-22% in 1914, or approximately 3.3.–3.6 million people, to around 3% in 1927. Some Christians in the Empire also suffered the injustice of being forced in a status of concubinage.

After reviewing the martyrology of Christians killed by the Ottomans from the fall of Constantinople all the way to the final phases of the Greek War of Independence, Constantelos reports: 

Constantelos concludes:"The story of the neomartyrs indicates that there was no liberty of conscience in the Ottoman Empire and that religious persecution was never absent from the state. Justice was subject to the passions of judges as well as of the crowds, and it was applied with a double standard, lenient for Muslims and harsh for Christians and others. The view that the Ottoman Turks pursued a policy of religious toleration in order to promote a fusion of the Turks with the conquered populations is not sustained by the facts."

Devşirme

Beginning with Murad I in the 14th century and extending through the 17th century, the Ottoman Empire employed devşirme (دوشيرم), a kind of tribute or conscription system where young Christian boys were taken from communities in the Balkans, enslaved and converted to Islam and later employed either in the Janissary military corps or the Ottoman administrative system. The most promising students were enrolled in the Enderun School, whose graduates would fill the higher positions. Most of the children collected were from the Empire's Balkan territories, where the devşirme system was referred to as the "blood tax". When the children ended up becoming Islamic due to the milieu in which they were raised, any children that they had were considered to be free Muslims.

Taxation

Taxation from the perspective of dhimmis was "a concrete continuation of the taxes paid to earlier regimes" (but now lower under the Muslim rule) and from the point of view of the Muslim conqueror was a material proof of the dhimmis' subjection. Dhimmis under Ottoman rule also lived with a tax on human lives, know at the time as Devşirme. This was the practice of taking of male Christian children and converting them into Muslims, and having them work for the Ottoman Government.

Religious architecture
The Ottoman Empire regulated how its cities would be built (quality assurances) and how the architecture (structural integrity, social needs, etc.) would be shaped.

Prior to the Tanzimat (a period of reformation beginning in 1839), special restrictions were imposed concerning the construction, renovation, size and the bells in Orthodox churches. For example, an Orthodox church's bell tower had to be slightly shorter than the minaret of the largest mosque in the same city. Hagia Photini in İzmir was a notable exception, as its bell tower was the tallest landmark of the city by far. They also must not exceed in grandeur or elegance. Only some churches were allowed to be built, but this was considered suspect, and some churches even fell into disrepair.

Many of the famous churches where bought and converted or converted as a result of the prior Christian population converting to Islam. Many Byzantine churches along with other Eastern Orthodox churches from other Balkan states have been left intact, notable examples of which are the Hagia Irene, Cathedral of Saint Domnius, Church of the Holy Apostles Peter and Paul, Ras, Kotor Cathedral, Church of the Holy Sepulchre and many more so it is indeed incorrect to state that the Ottoman Empire did not put effort into preserving minorities of different religions particularly the Christian population's religious architecture.

See also
History of the Eastern Orthodox Church under the Ottoman Empire
Christianity in Turkey

References

Sources

Further reading
  ("Chapter 8. Christian States and their Nationals in the Ottoman Territory")

 
Ottoman culture
Religion and geography
Christianity and Islam